The 2007 Tampa Mayoral Election was held to elect the mayor of Tampa, Florida.

Incumbent Mayor Pam Iorio was re-elected to a second term, winning just under 80% of the vote.

Results

References

2007
Mayoral election, 2007
Tampa
Tampa